The Spear of Fuchai is the spear of King Fuchai of Wu, the archrival of King Goujian of Yue. It was unearthed in Jiangling, Hubei in November 1983. The script on it is bird-worm seal script, a variant of seal script that was commonly used in the southern states such as Wu and Yue. The inscription mirrors the text of King Goujian's Sword, except changing the name of the owner and type of weapon. In this case, the text reads, "吴王夫差自作用矛" or "King Fuchai of Wu made for his personal use, this spear."

Archaeological artifacts of China
Chinese melee weapons
Wu (state)
1983 archaeological discoveries
Ancient weapons
Spears
Individual weapons